Rudolph Walton School is a historic school building located in the Strawberry Mansion neighborhood of Philadelphia, Pennsylvania. It was built in 1900–1901, and is a 3 1/2-story building, of coursed, cast stone ashlar. Brick additions were built in 1915 and 1924.  It has a low hipped roof and large double hung windows. The projecting central entrance pavilion has a Renaissance Revival-style portico. It was among the first schools designed by J. Horace Cook after his appointment as supervising architect for the school board. The school was named for merchant Rudolph Walton (1826–1900).

The building was added to the National Register of Historic Places in 1986. The school has been abandoned since 2003 despite attempts to re-open as a charter school.

References

School buildings on the National Register of Historic Places in Philadelphia
Renaissance Revival architecture in Pennsylvania
School buildings completed in 1901
Strawberry Mansion, Philadelphia
Defunct schools in Pennsylvania
1901 establishments in Pennsylvania